Šolak is a surname. Notable bearers of the name include:

 Dragan Šolak (born 1980), Serbian chess grandmaster 
 Nataša Šolak (born 1975), Serbian actress

See also
 Dominik Solák (born 1997), Czech handballer
 Solak, Armenia
 Solak (disambiguation)